Asif Raza Mir is a Pakistani actor and producer. 

Starting his acting career at the age of 17, he has since worked in a number of films, including Miss Hongkong, Daaman, Wafaa, Playboy, Badalte Mausam, and Saathi alongside various cinema stars. 

He has also been part of in several famous TV series such as Darwaza, Samudar, Tanhaiyaan, Tansen, Choti Choti Baatein, Roshni and Ishq Gumshuda.

Asif Raza Mir's international debut was in the British series  Gangs Of London. He is a series regular on this project.

Family
Asif Raza Mir is the son of film director Raza Mir (d. 2002), who was also the cinematographer for the first ever Pakistani film, Teri Yaad (1948).

Television

Darwaza
Samundar
Dasht e Tanhai
 Abhi Abhi as Ahmed Baig (Imran Abbas's Dad)
Choti Choti Baatein
Tanhaiyaan
 Nishan-e-Haider as an Indian Army Officer
Amawas
Aangan Terha
Tansen
Mere Dard Ko Jo Zuban Mile
Maigh Malhar
Badlon Per Basera
Sarkar Sahab as Sarkar Sahab
Tere Liye
Baarish Ke Aansoo
Aasman Choone Do
 Anokha Bandhan
Agar Tum Na Hote
Abhi Door Hai Kinara
Ishq Gumshuda
Dil Hai Chota Sa
The Ghost
Mujhe Apna Bana Lo - Hum TV
Kaisi Hain Doorian
 Din Dhallay
Roag
Shehr e Dil Ke Darwaze
 Haal e Dil
Qissa Chaar Darwesh
Diya Jalay
Qaid-e-Tanhai
Main Abdul Qadir Hoon
Tanhaiyan Naye Silsilay
 Siskiyan
Muqabil as Masood (2016)
Moray Saiyaan (2017)
 Kitni Girhain Baqi Hain as Hameed Azfar (Ep:8) & Atif (Ep:30)
Parchayee
 Nibah
Khalish
Gangs of London 2020 as Asif (British Crime Drama) Sky TV

Films

Accolades
He and Ahad Raza Mir are the only father-son duo to win Best TV Actor at the Lux Style Awards.

References

External links
 
 Asif Raza Mir at Mag4you

 Living people
 Pakistani male film actors
 Pakistani male television actors
 Pakistani television producers
 Male actors from Karachi
1959 births
 St. Anthony's High School, Lahore alumni
 Male actors in Urdu cinema